Five French ships of the French Navy have borne the name Foudroyante:
 A bomb vessel (1682)
 A bomb vessel (1695)
 A bomb vessel (1728) of the Ardente class
 A 16-gun vessel (1795)
 A floating battery (1855) of the 

See also:
 

French Navy ship names